The Arboretum de Camors (1 hectare) is an arboretum located within the Forêt Domaniale de Camors at Lambel, Camors, Morbihan, Bretagne, France. It is open daily without charge.

The arboretum appears to have been created before 1945 along the railroad tracks that pass Lambel, where the Office National des Forêts planted 74 conifer varieties. Today, some have disappeared and many others were damaged by a storm in October 1987. The arboretum appears to be in decay and used primarily as a walking path.

See also 
 List of botanical gardens in France

References 
 Culture.gouv.fr entry (French)
 Patrimoine de France entry (French)
 Commune de Camors description (French)
 L'Echo des Chênaies entry (French)
 Tela-Botanica wiki
 Photographs of conifers in arboretum
 Photograph of arboretum along train track

Camors, Arboretum de
Camors, Arboretum de